Givi Berikashvili (15 May 1933 – 10 April 2017) was a Georgian film and theatre actor.

Born in the village of Kolagi, now part of the Gurjaani Municipality, Berikashvili graduated from the Georgian Institute of Theatre in 1956. Since then, he performed at the Drama Theatre of Rustavi, that of Sukhumi, and finally, at Marjanishvili Theatre in Tbilisi. His notable films include: Londre, Wine Thieves, The Wishing Tree, Data Tutashkhia, Everyone Wants to Love, The Turtledoves of Paradise, and others. Among his many accolades are the title of People's Artist of Georgia (1979) and the Shota Rustaveli Prize. He died of respiratory failure in 2017. He was buried at the Saburtalo church of the Ascension in Tbilisi.

References

External links
 
 Givi Berikashvili on Georgian National Filmography
 Givi Berikashvili on Georgian Journal

1933 births
2017 deaths
Male film actors from Georgia (country)
Male stage actors from Georgia (country)
People's Artists of Georgia
Rustaveli Prize winners
Deaths from respiratory failure